During the 1970–71 English football season, Everton F.C. competed in the Football League First Division. They finished 14th in the table with 37 points.

Final league table

Results

Charity Shield

Football League First Division

FA Cup

European Cup

Squad

References

1970–71
Everton F.C. season